Juinagar is a railway station on the Harbour Line of the Mumbai Suburban Railway network.

Juinagar Station Complex is located in sector 11 of Sanpada node but its very close to Nerul and can be called the external suburb of Nerul. It is adjoining to Sion–Panvel Highway. It is an attractive station complex in terms of location and aesthetics with colourful murals and outrageous fibreglass sculptures and hence is frequently used for film shootings. Station complex consists of shopping area on the ground floor and well-integrated shops/ office premises on the first and second floors. This station caters for three corridors viz. CSMT–Panvel, Thane–Panvel & Nerul–Uran

References

Railway stations in Thane district
Mumbai Suburban Railway stations
Mumbai CR railway division